Acacia tuberculata is a shrub of the genus Acacia and the subgenus Phyllodineae. It is native to a small area in the  Wheatbelt region of Western Australia.

It blooms in September and produces yellow flowers.

See also
 List of Acacia species

References

tuberculata
Acacias of Western Australia
Taxa named by Bruce Maslin